Anjar (meaning "unresolved or running river";  / ALA-LC: ‘Anjar; also known as Hosh Mousa ( / Ḥawsh Mūsá), is a town of Lebanon located in the Bekaa Valley. The population is 2,400, consisting almost entirely of Armenians. The total area is about twenty square kilometers (7.7 square miles). In the summer, the population swells to 3,500, as members of the Armenian diaspora return to visit there. In the ancient world, it was known as Chalkis.

History
The town's foundation is normally attributed to the Umayyad caliph al-Walid I, at the beginning of the 8th century, as a palace-city. Syriac graffiti found in the quarry from which the best stone was extracted offer the year 714, and there are Byzantine and Syriac sources attributing the establishment of the town to Umayyad princes, with one Syriac chronicle mentioning Walid I by name, while the Byzantine chronicler Theophanes the Confessor recorded that it was Walid's son, al-Abbas, who started building the town in 709-10. Historian Jere L. Bacharach accepts Theophanes' date. Although earlier materials were re-used, much of the city is built on virgin soil.

After being abandoned in later years, Anjar was resettled in 1939 with several thousand Armenian refugees from the Musa Dagh area. Its neighborhoods are named after the six villages of Musa Dagh: Haji Habibli, Kebusiyeh, Vakif, Kheder Bek, Yoghunoluk and Bitias.  Like much of Lebanon in the 1960s, the town prospered economically. 

After the start of the Lebanese civil war, the villagers started organising a local defense force in order to deter any hostile force coming from the surrounding Muslim villages, whose extremists saw the existence of a Christian village in the region as irritating. Soon, the village became known as a stronghold in the region, mainly because of its well-organized militia. During the civil war, Anjar was forced to make alliances and negotiate with several of the belligerents in order to maintain peace, most notably Syria. The Syrian Army chose Anjar as one of its main military bases in the Beqaa Valley and the headquarters of its intelligence services.

Following the civil war, Anjar started to rebuild economically. Many of its inhabitants immigrated to other countries, mainly to Europe, Canada, and the United States. Nevertheless, today Anjar is an example to many other entities in the region because of its low crime rate, reduced air pollution, and high living standards. During the 2020 COVID-19 pandemic, the village rapidly imposed strict measures and set an example for the rest of the country.

Religion and education

The majority of Anjar's Armenians are Armenian Apostolics (Orthodox) who belong to the Armenian Apostolic Church and Holy See of Cilicia. Armenian Apostolic Saint Paul Church is the second largest Armenian church in Lebanon.

The Armenian Apostolic community has its own school, Haratch Calouste Gulbenkian Secondary School. In 1940, the chief editor of the Armenian newspaper Haratch in Paris, Shavarsh Missakian, organized a fundraising campaign among the Armenians living in France which enabled the building of the "Haratch" Elementary School next to the newly established St. Paul Armenian Apostolic Church.  The official opening of the school took place in 1941. The administration of the Calouste Gulbenkian Foundation contributed to the expansion of the school, which was named in honor of Calouste Gulbenkian.

Our Lady of the Rosary Armenian Catholic Church in Anjar serves as church for the Armenian Catholics,  who also run the Armenian Catholic Sisters School. In the beginning, the school had two divisions, St. Hovsep for the male students and Sisters of Immaculate Conception for the female students. In 1954, these departments were united. 1973 saw the official opening of the Aghajanian Orphan House, already serving as an Armenian Catholic orphanage since 1968.

The Armenian Evangelical Church of Anjar is in operation to serve Anjar's small Armenian Evangelical community.  The Protestant community school was established in 1948 by Sister Hedwig Aienshanslin as part of her missionary work in Anjar. In 1953, the school, which had already become an intermediate school, was promoted into a secondary school. It has day classes as well as boarding facilities for students from other regions who stay there throughout the winter.

Economy
Anjar's economy is mostly based on services, with very few agricultural and industrial activities. The biggest private employer is by far the company "Shams" (literally "Sun"), a local family-run business that started out as a small restaurant on the main street of the village in the 1960s. Today, the company has many properties on the territory of Anjar and its surroundings, including hotels, resorts, a gas station, a bowling alley, etc.  

The municipality is also an important employer. It pays salaries for teachers, public servants, and law enforcement personnel. Unlike the rest of the country, where policing is provided by the central government, Anjar has its own municipal police wearing dark green uniforms and reporting to the municipality instead of the ministry of internal affairs.

Anjar has numerous small family-run businesses, which form the backbone of the local economy. Some of these businesses succeeded in making a name for themselves, and thus have clients from across the country. For example, "Coiffure Yessoug", a local barbier and beauty shop, is one of the most popular salons for soon-to-be married women, having commercial billboards as far as Beirut.

Anjar antiquities
Formerly known as Gerrha, a stronghold built by Umayyad Caliph Al-Walid ibn Abdel Malek in the 8th century, the site was later abandoned, leaving a number of well-preserved ruins. The present-day name derives from Arabic Ayn Gerrha, or "source of Gerrha".  The exclusively Umayyad ruins have been recognized as a World Heritage Site.

The city ruins cover 114,000 square meters and are surrounded by large, fortified stone walls over two meters thick and seven meters high. The rectangular city design of 370 m by 310 m is based on Roman city planning and architecture with stonework borrowed from the Byzantines. Two large avenues, the Cardo maximum, running north to south, and the Decumanus Maximus, running east to west, divide the city into four quadrants. The two main avenues, decorated with colonnades and flanked by about 600 shops, intersect under
a tetrapylon. The plinths, shafts and capitals of the tetrapylon are spolia reused in the Umayyad period. Smaller streets subdivide the western half of the city in quarters of different size. 

Main monuments:
 The partially rebuilt Grand Palace, 59 m by 70 m, includes a wall and is preceded by a series of arcades. Its central hosh (courtyard) is  surrounded by a peristyle.
 The almost square Small Palace, 46 m by 47 m, stands out for its numerous ornamental fragments and its richly decorated central entrance.
 A Mosque, 45 m by 32 m, is located between the two palaces.
 Thermal baths, built on the Roman model.

The numerous fragments of friezes with plant, figurative and geometric motifs are proving of once rich decorated buildings.

See also 
Armenians in Lebanon
Franco-Armenian relations
List of Armenian ethnic enclaves
Battle of Anjar
8th century in Lebanon

Gallery

References

Bibliography

External links 

 Official Website of Anjar
Anjar, Archnet Digital Library.
 Website about Anjar
 Lebanon, the Cedars' Land: Anjar
 Ya Libnan | Lebanon News | Spotlight on Anjar
 Photos of Anjar ruins

Populated places in Zahlé District
Populated places in Lebanon
Archaeological sites in Lebanon
World Heritage Sites in Lebanon
Armenian communities in Lebanon
Former populated places in Lebanon
Arabic architecture
Umayyad palaces
Tourist attractions in Lebanon
8th-century establishments in the Umayyad Caliphate